The Hussain Dawood Pledge (HD-Pledge) is one of the biggest private donations and initiatives to fight against the COVID-19 pandemic in Pakistan. Hussain Dawood, on behalf of Engro, Dawood Hercules and his family pledged on 2 April 2020 a contribution in services, kind, and cash of Pakistani rupee (PKR) 1 billion (~6 million USD).
The contribution became public a day after Prime Minister Imran Khan announced the coronavirus relief fund to fight the pandemic and urged everyone to donate.

Purpose & Context 

Since the outbreak of the coronavirus in 2019 and the first proven case in Pakistan on 26th February 2020,  the government initiated measures to prevent the spread. The HD-Pledge was started as an initiative to support various organisations active in the healthcare system and to support measures against the spread of COVID-19 to reduce the impact.

Targets 

With the publication of the pledge, it was announced that the four key areas are:
 Disease prevention, with a major focus on testing and diagnostics.
 Protecting and enabling healthcare practitioners and other key workers, who are at the frontline of the fight against this pandemic.
 Enabling patient care and facilities; and
 Bolster livelihoods and sustenance of the most deserving in society.

Implementation 

The HD-Pledge funds are disbursed primarily through The Dawood Foundation and Engro Foundation. The pledge management, a dedicated committee composed of leadership figures of Mr. Dawood's business enterprises and associated philanthropic foundations headed by Sabrina Dawood, developed the overarching strategy and is assessing applications for funds according to the criteria of sustainable impact and saving lives.

The funds are open to any credible organisation, whether public and private hospitals, NGO, private enterprises, or foundations, who can apply.

Achievements 

To date (August 2021), PKR 497,870,000 or almost 49% of the fund of the HD-Pledge have been donated via cash and kind.

Some selected examples of how this amount was donated:

 PKR 28 million contribution to the Patients' Aid Foundation for the procurement of 14,000 medical grade scrubs to protect medical staff against the rising incidence of COVID-19 in Karachi.
 PKR 70 million contribution to the Ehsaas Amdan Program focused on smallholder farmers in the livestock sector in collaboration with the Pakistan Poverty Alleviation Fund (PPAF) as the implementing partner.
 PKR 20 million in financial assistance to Shaukat Khanum Memorial Cancer Hospital & Research Centre to expand COVID-19 testing capacity across Southern Punjab and strengthen the health sector to cope with the ongoing pandemic (April 2020).
 PKR 40 million to extend the partnership with Shaukat Khanum Memorial Cancer Hospital and Research Centre for expansion of COVID-19 testing capacity in Southern Punjab (June 2020).
 PKR 79.5 million contribution to a collaborative project with Aga Khan University to build the capacity of frontline healthcare professionals to manage COVID-19 patients across the country.
 PKR 18.7 million for the establishment of a High Dependency Unit (HDU) at The Indus Hospital, Karachi, to enhance COVID-19 patient care and facilities.
 PKR 12 million committed to establish an Intensive Care Unit (ICU) at Nishtar Medical University & Hospital, Multan. This included the set up and operationalisation of a 20-bed dedicated HDU with medical equipment.
 459,000 units of personal protective equipment (PPE) worth Rs100 million for front-line healthcare practitioners treating COVID-19 patients.
 Support Sehat Kahani by adding 100 more doctors to the telemedicine app to facilitate a greater number of virtual consultations.
 PKR 95 million to the Indus Hospital to expand the COVID-19 testing capacity across Sindh under the Sindh Screening Programme — Free of Cost.
 PKR 7,9 million to promote mental health-support among frontline workers and the general population directly affected by COVID-19 pandemic together with the British Asian Trust and IRD Pakistan.

Partners 

The following entities have partnered with the HD-Pledge (as of August 2021).

Partners on Disease Prevention
 Shaukat Khanum Memorial Cancer Hospital and Research Centre
 Indus Hospital and Health Network

Partners in Enabling Healthcare practitioners
 Ayub Teaching Hospital, Abbottabad
 Allied Hospital, Faisalabad
 DHQ Hospital, Faisalabad
 Government General Hospital Ghulam Muhammad Abad, Faisalabad
 British Asian Trust & IRD Pakistan
 Layton Rahmatullah Benevolent Trust
 Afzaal Memorial Thalassemia Foundation
 National Disaster Management Authority
 Pakistan Air Force
 Liaquat National Hospital
 Dow University, Ojha Campus
 Sheikh Zayed Hospital, Rahim Yar Khan
 Fatima Jinnah General Hospital, Quetta

Partners in Enabling Patient Care
 Aziz Bhatti Shaheed Hospital, Gujrat
 Sheikh Zayed Hospital, Rahim Yar Khan
 Nishtar Hospital, Multan
 Khyber Teaching Hospital, Peshawar
 Abbasi Shaheed Hospital, Karachi
 Shaheed Mohtarma Benazir Bhutto Accident Emergency & Trauma Centre, Karachi
 Jinnah Postgraduate Medical Centre, Karachi
 Sindh Govt Coronavirus Emergency Fund
 Sehat Kahani

Partner in Bolstering livelihoods & sustenance
 Pakistan Poverty Alleviation Fund, Ehsaas Amdan Program

References

Further reading 
 Pakistan's Response to COVID-19: Overcoming National and International Hypes to Fight the Pandemic, JMIR Public Health Surveill. 2021 May; 7(5): e28517. Published online 2021 May 19. doi: 10.2196/28517

COVID-19 pandemic in Pakistan